Olesia Yuriyivna Vlasova (born 14 September 1974) is a Ukrainian stage and film actress of Russian origin. She is a two-time laureate of the "Kyiv Pectoral" theater award (1999, 2004) and was included among the TOP-20 actresses of Ukraine according to "Ukrainian Pravda. Life" (2009).

Biography
Vlasova was born on 14 September 1974 in Moscow Oblast.

In early childhood, she moved with her parents to Odesa, where she graduated from school. From 1990 to 1995, she studied at the Odesa Theater Lyceum and worked as a TV host on Channel 7. In 1999, she graduated from the Kyiv National I. K. Karpenko-Kary Theatre, Cinema and Television University. Since 2000, she has been an actress at the New Drama Theater in Pechersk.

Vlasova is married to Ukrainian actor Ihor Rubashkin. She gave birth to two daughters, Appolinaria (Polina) and Varvara.

References

External links
 

1974 births
Living people
People from Moscow Oblast
Ukrainian women television presenters
Ukrainian film actresses
Ukrainian television actresses
20th-century Ukrainian actresses
21st-century Ukrainian actresses
Recipients of the title of Merited Artist of Ukraine